Western Courage is a 1935 American Western film directed by Spencer Gordon Bennet and starring Ken Maynard, Geneva Mitchell and Charles K. French.

Cast
 Ken Maynard as Ken Baxter
 Geneva Mitchell as Gloria Hanley
 Charles K. French as Henry Hanley 
 Betty Blythe as Mrs. Hanley
 Cornelius Keefe as Eric Simpson
 Ward Bond as Lacrosse
 E.H. Calvert as Colonel Austin 
 Renee Whitney as Eric's Girl Friend
 Hal Taliaferro as Slim

References

Bibliography
 Pitts, Michael R. Western Movies: A Guide to 5,105 Feature Films. McFarland, 2012.

External links
 

1935 films
1935 Western (genre) films
1930s English-language films
American Western (genre) films
Films directed by Spencer Gordon Bennet
American black-and-white films
Columbia Pictures films
1930s American films